The Lebanese Movement in Support of Fatah – LMSF (Arabic: الحركة اللبنانية لدعم فتح | Al-Harakat al-Lubnaniyyat li daem Fath) was established in 1968 by Dr. Usama Fakhuri, a second-rank Sunni politician opposed to leading Beirut Sunni za'im Saeb Salam.  As its name implies, the LMSF received Fatah backing from the outset and joined the ranks of the Lebanese National Movement (LNM) in 1975.

See also 
Lebanese Civil War
Lebanese National Movement
Palestine Liberation Organization
List of weapons of the Lebanese Civil War

References 
 Rex Brynen, Sanctuary and Survival: the PLO in Lebanon, Boulder: Westview Press, Oxford 1990.  – 

Israeli–Lebanese conflict
Defunct political parties in Lebanon
Lebanese National Movement
Factions in the Lebanese Civil War